Shaky or Shakey may refer to:

People

Shakey
 Shakey Graves, stage name of Americana musician Alejandro Rose-Garcia (born 1987)
 Shakey Jake (1925-2007), American street musician and storyteller in Ann Arbor, Michigan
 Shakey Jake Harris (1921–1990), American Chicago blues singer, harmonica player and songwriter
 Big Walter Horton (1921-1981), American blues harmonica player
 Sherwood Johnson (1925-1998), American businessman, founder of Shakey's Pizza
 Mike Walton (born 1945), Canadian retired National Hockey League and World Hockey Association player
 "Bernard Shakey", pseudonym of Neil Young when he directs films

Shaky
 Jim Hunt (columnist) (1926–2006), Canadian sports columnist
 Thomas Kain (1907–1971), American minor league baseball player and manager, college football referee
 Shaky Kane or Shaky 2000, pseudonyms of British writer and psychedelic artist Michael Coulthard
 Shakin' Stevens or Shaky, stage names of Welsh rock-and-roll singer and songwriter Michael Barratt (born 1948)
 Bob Walton (1912–1992), Canadian hockey player

Other uses
 Shaky (album), by Shakin' Stevens
 Shakey: Neil Young's biography, written by Jimmy McDonough
 Shakey River, Michigan, United States
 Shakey Sanchez, The Muppets character
 Shakey the robot, the first general-purpose mobile robot to be able to reason about its own actions, developed between 1966 and 1972
 Shakey's Frozen Custard, original name of Shake's Frozen Custard, an American franchise chain
 Shakey's Pizza, an American restaurant chain
 Shakey's V-League, a women's volleyball league in the Philippines
 Shaky, an enemy of Dick Tracy - see List of Dick Tracy villains

See also
 Douglas C-124 Globemaster II, a cargo airplane nicknamed "Old Shaky"
 Shaky Isles or Islands, a nickname for New Zealand
 Daly's bridge, also known as the Shakey Bridge, a pedestrian bridge in Cork, Ireland

Lists of people by nickname